The Devlin Connection is an American television crime drama starring Rock Hudson and Jack Scalia. The show aired on NBC for 13 episodes in 1982, premiering on October 2.

Premise 

Hudson stars as Brian Devlin, a former military intelligence officer and ex-owner of a detective agency who is now the director of the Performing Arts Center in Los Angeles. Devlin meets racquetball pro and private investigator Nick Corsello (Scalia), who is revealed to be Devlin's son from a brief affair 28 years earlier. The accent of the show was put on the fun of investigating crimes instead of classic drama crime investigation. Hudson's intent was to create "classy, sophisticated, educational, literate entertainment". The duo proceed to solve a mystery-of-the-week.

Hudson and Scalia had previously worked together on the film The Star Maker in 1981. The Devlin Connection was Harvey Frand's first job as a producer.

Cast
 Rock Hudson as Brian Devlin, director of Performing Arts Center
 Jack Scalia as Nick Corsello, racquetball pro and private detective
 Leigh Taylor-Young as Lauren Dane, Brian's assistant
 Louis Giambalvo as Lt. Earl Borden, Nick's friend and former colleague from New York
 Takayo as Mrs. Watanabe, Brian's housekeeper
 Melanie Vincz as Alice Arms, Nick's health club co-worker
 Jack Kruschen as Max Salkall, orchestra conductor at Performing Arts Center
 Irene Tedrow as Margaret Hollister, Brian's assistant
 Herbert Jefferson, Jr. as Otis Barnes, Nick's friend and night club owner
1Character only in second version filmed in 1982 but aired first.
2Character only in first version filmed in 1981 but aired second.

Production changes 

Production started in 1981 but after several episodes were filmed it was delayed a year due to Hudson's heart problems (heart surgery with five heart bypasses). When the filming resumed there were many changes. In the first version Brian has an older assistant (Irene Tedrow), and his office and apartment are modest. Nick is a Vietnam veteran and now just a small-time private detective who works out of a night club. The stories are grittier. In the second version Brian's assistant is glamorous (Leigh Taylor-Young), and his office and apartment are much larger and more sumptuous. Nick is a former NYPD officer and now a racquetball pro who works at a health club and investigates on the side. The stories are much more upscale. At Hudson's insistence, the nine flashier episodes aired first which was a little confusing because the episode where they actually meet, "Claudine", became the tenth episode.

Episodes

1NBC burned off the final episode in 1983. All 13 episodes aired on TV Land in the late 1990s.

Ratings
<onlyinclude>

Video releases 

In the mid-1980s Trans World Entertainment officially released the first three episodes on VHS videotape cassettes. There are also bootleg DVDs of all the TV Land aired episodes.

References

External links 

1980s American crime drama television series
1980s American mystery television series
1982 American television series debuts
1982 American television series endings
American detective television series
English-language television shows
NBC original programming
Television series by CBS Studios
Television shows filmed in Los Angeles
Television shows set in Los Angeles